Arthur Duarte (1895–1982) was a Portuguese actor, screenwriter, production designer  and film director.

Selected filmography
 Carmen (1926)
 The Republic of Flappers (1928)
 Because I Love You (1928)
 Ludwig II, King of Bavaria (1929)
 Column X (1929)
 Rustle of Spring (1929)
 Women on the Edge (1929)
 Love in the Ring (1930)
 Mischievous Miss (1930)
 The Woman Without Nerves (1930)
 Scapa Flow (1930)
 Wild Cattle (1934)
 Os Fidalgos da Casa Mourisca (1938)
 O Costa do Castelo (1943)
 A Menina da Rádio (1944)
 O Leão da Estrela (1947)
 A Garça e a Serpente (1952)
 O Noivo das Caldas (1956)
 Em Legítima Defesa — Encontro com a Morte (1965)
 Recompensa (1977)

Portuguese male film actors
Portuguese male silent film actors
Portuguese film directors
Portuguese screenwriters
Male screenwriters
Portuguese male writers
1895 births
1982 deaths
People from Lisbon
20th-century screenwriters